List of hospitals in West Virginia (U.S. state), sorted by hospital name.

Beckley Appalachian Regional Hospital - Beckley, West Virginia (Raleigh County)
Braxton County Memorial Hospital - Gassaway, West Virginia (Braxton County)
Bluefield Regional Medical Center - Bluefield, West Virginia (Mercer County)
Boone Memorial Hospital - Madison, West Virginia (Boone County)
Broaddus Hospital - Philippi, West Virginia (Barbour County)
Cabell Huntington Hospital - Huntington, West Virginia (Cabell and Wayne Counties)
Camden Clark Medical Center - Parkersburg, West Virginia (Wood County)
Charleston Area Medical Center – Charleston, West Virginia (Kanawha County) unless otherwise indicated
CAMC General Division
CAMC Memorial Division
CAMC Women and Children's Hospital
CAMC Teays Valley Hospital – Teays Valley (postal address Hurricane, West Virginia) (Putnam County)
City Hospital - Martinsburg, West Virginia (Berkeley County)
Davis Memorial Hospital - Elkins, West Virginia (Randolph County)
Fairmont Regional Medical Center - Fairmont, West Virginia (Marion County)
Grafton City Hospital - Grafton, West Virginia (Taylor County)
Grant Memorial Hospital- Petersburg, West Virginia (Grant County)
Greenbrier Valley Medical Center - Ronceverte, West Virginia (Greenbrier County)
Hampshire Memorial Hospital - Romney, West Virginia (Hampshire County)
HealthSouth Rehabilitation Hospital - Huntington, West Virginia (Cabell and Wayne Counties)
Highland-Clarksburg Hospital - Clarksburg, West Virginia (Harrison County)
Highland Hospital - Charleston, West Virginia (Kanawha County)
Hoops Family Children's Hospital - Huntington, West Virginia 
Jackson General Hospital - Ripley, West Virginia (Jackson County)
Jefferson Memorial Hospital - Ranson, West Virginia (Jefferson County)
Logan Regional Medical Center - Logan, West Virginia (Logan County)
Man Appalachian Regional Hospital (closed) Man, West Virginia (Logan County)
Marmet Hospital for Crippled Children (closed) Marmet, West Virginia (Kanawha County)
Mildred Mitchell-Bateman Hospital - Huntington, West Virginia 
Minnie Hamilton Health Center - Grantsville, West Virginia (Calhoun County)
Mon Health Medical Center - Morgantown, West Virginia (Monongalia County)
Montgomery General Hospital - Montgomery, West Virginia (Fayette and Kanawha Counties)
Ohio Valley Medical Center (OVMC) - Wheeling, West Virginia (Marshall and Ohio Counties)
Plateau Medical Center - Oak Hill, West Virginia (Fayette County)
Pleasant Valley Hospital- Point Pleasant, West Virginia (Mason County)
Pocahontas Memorial Hospital - Buckeye, West Virginia (Pocahontas County)
Potomac Valley Hospital - Keyser, West Virginia 
Preston Memorial Hospital - Kingwood, West Virginia (Preston County)
Princeton Community Hospital Princeton, West Virginia (Mercer County)
Raleigh General Hospital - Beckley, West Virginia (Raleigh County)
Reynolds Memorial Hospital - Glen Dale, West Virginia (Marshall County)
Richwood Area Community Hospital (closed) - Richwood, West Virginia (Nicholas County)
River Park Hospital - Huntington, West Virginia (Cabell and Wayne Counties)
Roane General Hospital - Spencer, West Virginia (Roane County)
St. Francis Hospital - Charleston, West Virginia (Kanawha County)
St. Joseph's Hospital (Buckhannon, West Virginia) - Buckhannon, West Virginia (Upshur County)
St. Joseph's Hospital (Parkersburg, West Virginia)(closed) - Parkersburg, West Virginia (Wood County)
St. Mary's Medical Center - Huntington, West Virginia (Cabell and Wayne Counties)
Select Specialty Hospital - Morgantown, Virginia 
Sistersville General Hospital - Sistersville, West Virginia (Tyler County)
Stonewall Jackson Memorial Hospital - Weston, West Virginia (Lewis County)
Summers County Appalachian Regional Hospital - Hinton, West Virginia (Summers County)
Summersville Memorial Hospital - Summersville, West Virginia (Nicholas County)
Stevens Clinic Hospital (closed) Welch, West Virginia (McDowell County)
Thomas Memorial Hospital - South Charleston, West Virginia (Kanawha County)
United Hospital Center - Clarksburg, West Virginia (Harrison County)
Veterans Affairs Medical Center - Beckley, West Virginia (Raleigh County)
Veterans Affairs Medical Center (Louis A. Johnson VAMC) - Clarksburg, West Virginia (Harrison County)
Veterans Affairs Medical Center - Huntington, West Virginia (Cabell and Wayne Counties)
Veterans Affairs Medical Center - Martinsburg, West Virginia (Berkeley County)
War Memorial Hospital - Berkeley Springs, West Virginia (Morgan County)
Webster County Memorial Hospital - Webster Springs, West Virginia (Webster County)
Weirton Medical Center - Weirton, West Virginia (Brooke and Hancock Counties)
Welch Community Hospital - Welch, West Virginia (McDowell County)
West Virginia University Health System - Morgantown, West Virginia (Monongalia County)
J.W. Ruby Memorial Hospital - Morgantown, West Virginia (Monongalia County)
Chestnut Ridge Center - Morgantown, West Virginia (Monongalia County)
Jon Michael Moore Trauma Center - Morgantown, West Virginia (Monongalia County)
Mary Babb Randolph Cancer Center - Morgantown, West Virginia (Monongalia County)
Rockefeller Neuroscience Institute - Morgantown, West Virginia (Monongalia County)
Rockefeller Neuroscience Institute Innovation Center - Morgantown, West Virginia (Monongalia County)
WVU Medicine Children’s - Morgantown, West Virginia (Monongalia County)
Wetzel County Hospital - New Martinsville, West Virginia (Wetzel County)
Wheeling Hospital - Wheeling, West Virginia (Marshall and Ohio Counties)
Williamson Memorial Hospital - Williamson, West Virginia (Mingo County)

References

West Virginia
 
Hospitals